Old Alabam is an unincorporated community in Madison County, Arkansas, United States. It is located on AR 127 near U.S. Route 412. The community is about 4.5 miles northeast of Huntsville and one mile south of the community of Alabam.

References

Unincorporated communities in Madison County, Arkansas
Unincorporated communities in Arkansas
Arkansas placenames of Native American origin